Cederman is an Anglicized form of the Jewish surname Zajderman. Notable people with the surname include:

Duncan Cederman (born 1978), New Zealand cricketer
Lars-Erik Cederman (born 1963), Swiss-Swedish political scientist and professor